Thiel "Thierry" Iradukunda (born 12 July 1999), is a Burundian–Australian professional footballer who plays as a midfielder for National Premier Leagues Victoria club Green Gully.

Club career

Western United
On 1 September 2019, Iradukunda signed a scholarship contract with Western United for the 2019–20 season. He made his professional debut as a second-half substitute in a Round 13 clash against Melbourne City, replacing Dario Jertec in the 54th minute as they went on to lose 3–2. Iradukunda was released at the end of the 2019–20 A-League.

References

External links

1999 births
Living people
Australian soccer players
Association football midfielders
South Melbourne FC players
Melbourne Victory FC players
Western United FC players
Melbourne Knights FC players
National Premier Leagues players
A-League Men players
Burundian emigrants to Australia
People from Kigoma Region